Ronni Gamzu (Hebrew: רוני גמזו, b. January 27, 1966) is an Israeli doctor and professor who since 2015 has been the director of Ichilov Hospital, the country's second largest hospital. His specialty is in obstetrics and gynaecology and in healthcare management.

Before leading Ichilov, between 2010 and 2014, Gamzu was the director of the Ministry of Health.

In April 2020, during the COVID-19 pandemic in Israel, he was placed in charge of protecting seniors in retirement homes from the spread of the virus. In July 2020, he temporarily left his position at Ichilov to become the country's first COVID czar, a position for which he received public praise. In November 2020, he was replaced by Nachman Ash and returned to his previous role in Ichilov.

References

External links
https://www.tasmc.org.il/sites/en/Personnel/Pages/Gamzu-Ronni.aspx — Entry on the Ichilov Hospital website

1966 births
Israeli public health doctors
Israeli gynaecologists
Academic staff of Tel Aviv University
Living people